Astrid Hühn (born 10 June 1960) is a German handball player who played for the West German national team. She was born in Hamburg. She represented West Germany at the 1984 Summer Olympics in Los Angeles, where the West German team placed fourth.

References

1960 births
Living people
Sportspeople from Hamburg
German female handball players
Olympic handball players of West Germany
Handball players at the 1984 Summer Olympics